Eugène Schmitt was a French gymnast. He competed in seven events at the 1928 Summer Olympics.

References

External links
 

Year of birth missing
Possibly living people
French male artistic gymnasts
Olympic gymnasts of France
Gymnasts at the 1928 Summer Olympics
Place of birth missing